Neocuris is a genus of beetles in the family Buprestidae, containing the following species:

 Neocuris aenescens Carter, 1928
 Neocuris anthaxoides Fairmaire, 1877
 Neocuris asperipennis Fairmaire, 1877
 Neocuris brownii Carter, 1915
 Neocuris carnabyae Barker, 1999
 Neocuris carteri Obenberger, 1923
 Neocuris coerulans Fairmaire, 1877
 Neocuris crassa Obenberger, 1923
 Neocuris cuprilatera Fairmaire, 1877
 Neocuris dichroa Fairmaire, 1877
 Neocuris discoflava Fairmaire, 1877
 Neocuris doddi Carter, 1928
 Neocuris duboulayi Carter, 1937
 Neocuris fairmairei Blackburn, 1887
 Neocuris fortnumi (Hope, 1846)
 Neocuris gracilis Macleay, 1872
 Neocuris guerinii (Hope, 1843)
 Neocuris ignicollis Carter, 1937
 Neocuris monochroma Fairmaire, 1877
 Neocuris nickerli Obenberger, 1923
 Neocuris nitidipennis (Obenberger, 1915)
 Neocuris obscurata Obenberger, 1923
 Neocuris ornata Carter, 1913
 Neocuris pauperata Fairmaire, 1877
 Neocuris pubescens Blackburn, 1887
 Neocuris smaragdifrons Obenberger, 1923
 Neocuris thoracica Fairmaire, 1877
 Neocuris violacea Carter, 1928
 Neocuris viridiaurea Macleay, 1888
 Neocuris viridimicans Fairmaire, 1877

References

Buprestidae genera